Jan Stanisławski may refer to:
 Jan Stanisławski (lexicographer) (1893–1973)
 Jan Stanisławski (painter) (1860–1907)